Kim Kang-min (Hangul: 김강민, Hanja: 金江珉; born September 13, 1982) is a South Korean center fielder who plays for the SSG Landers in the KBO League. He bats and throws right-handed.

Professional career

Awards and honors
2010 Golden Glove Award (outfielder)

References

External links 
 Player profile at KBO 

1982 births
Living people
Sportspeople from Daegu
Asian Games gold medalists for South Korea
Asian Games medalists in baseball
Baseball players at the 2010 Asian Games
KBO League center fielders
Kyeongbuk High School alumni
Medalists at the 2010 Asian Games
SSG Landers players
South Korean baseball players
Korean Series MVPs